Pier 62 Skatepark is a public skatepark located in the Chelsea neighborhood of Manhattan, New York City. The skatepark, which opened in 2010, is located in Hudson River Park on Pier 62 overlooking the Hudson River. Pier 62 Skatepark is notable as it is the only modern full size vert concrete transition skatepark in New York City.

Pier 62 Skatepark can be accessed by entering Hudson River Park at 22nd Street.

History
When it opened in May 2010, Pier 62 Skatepark was the first modern full size vert concrete transition skatepark in New York City. The Skatepark was designed and built by California Skateparks/Site Design Group.

Terrain
Pier 62 Skatepark is an oval shaped concrete skatepark of about 15,000 sq ft. Its main features are a 10-foot-deep pool, a flow area and a street section. 
The pool has three sections, a 6-ft shallow end, a 6-1/2 ft pocket and a 10 ft deep end that just goes to vert. The flow area offers a wide variety of banks, transitions, hips and roll in spots including an over vert clam-shell, the flow area is 9 Ft. at its deepest with vert.The street area features a 2 ft Wedge and a 3 ft Start Box, the Intermediate Fun Box including a 24 ft Ledge, a Kinked Flat Rail, and an 18 ft Ollie Ledge.

Construction
Pier 62 Skatepark is notable as it is built on a challenging site, directly on top of Pier 62 in the Hudson River. It is constructed of a custom structural foam/concrete foundation system with cast-in-place concrete and shotcrete construction.

Events
In August 2012 Converse hosted the Converse City Carnage event. In October 2012, Vans hosted the Bowl-Arama event.

Gallery of photos from Pier 62 Skatepark

References

Skateparks in the United States
2010 establishments in New York City
Skateparks in New York City